The Council of the Republic was the upper house of the French parliament under the Fourth Republic, with the National Assembly being the lower house. It was established by the Constitution of 1946, dissolved by the Constitution of 1958 and replaced with the Senate.

History 
The constitution of the Fourth Republic, which came into force in 1946, stipulated that parliament was bicameral. The upper house was named the "Council of the Republic" (as opposed to the Senate of the Third Republic) and was granted greatly diminished powers.

Role 
The council did not have the power to make laws, which was the responsibility of the National Assembly. The council was mainly consultative, and bills were only given a single reading at the council before being passed.

However, it did share responsibility should the need arose to amend the constitution in matters regarding the election of the President of the Republic. A formal notice to the council was required to declare war.

In 1954, the Constitution was amended to provided that all bills would be examined successively by the National Assembly and the Council of the Republic, essentially restoring full legislative powers to the latter.

Composition 
Members of the Council were known as '"councillors" (conseiller) from 1946 to 1948, and then "senators" from 1948 onwards. The number of senators had to be between 250 and 320. Senators were elected by indirect universal suffrage: five-sixths were elected by communes and departments; the other one-sixth were elected by the National Assembly, the lower house. They served six-year terms.

President 

The President was the presiding officer of the council.

Political Party:

References

Notes 

20th century in France
French Fourth Republic
Government of France
Historical legislatures in France